Colin John Campbell  (born January 28, 1953) is a Canadian former professional ice hockey defenceman, coach and current executive vice president and director of hockey operations of the National Hockey League (NHL). As a player, he featured in the 1982 Stanley Cup Finals with the Vancouver Canucks.

Playing career
Campbell spent his junior career with the Peterborough Petes of the Ontario Hockey Association (later the Ontario Hockey League). He was taken in the second round of the 1973 NHL Amateur Draft, 27th overall by the Pittsburgh Penguins, and also in the first round of the 1973 WHA Amateur Draft, 5th overall, by the Vancouver Blazers. After one season with the Blazers, Campbell signed on with Pittsburgh.

Campbell went on to play for the Penguins, Edmonton Oilers, Vancouver Canucks, and Detroit Red Wings. A scrappy, physical defender, Campbell scored just 25 goals in 11 NHL seasons while accumulating almost 1300 penalty minutes. However, he had a knack for scoring key goals in the playoffs, scoring the series-clinching goal in Pittsburgh's first-round win over the St. Louis Blues in 1975, and posting a two-goal game for the Canucks in a win against the Los Angeles Kings en route to the Stanley Cup Finals in 1982 (he scored just 1 goal in two full regular seasons for the Canucks).

In his 11-year NHL career, Campbell appeared in 636 NHL games, posting 25 goals and 103 assists for 128 points, along with 1292 penalty minutes. He also played 78 games in the WHA, recording 3 goals and 23 points along with 191 PIM.

Career statistics

Coaching career
Immediately following his retirement in 1985, Campbell joined the Red Wings coaching staff under head coach Jacques Demers. During the 1988 Stanley Cup Playoffs, Campbell and assistant general manager Neil Smith discovered several Red Wings players, including Bob Probert and Petr Klima, out past curfew. The incident occurred at a suburban Edmonton bar called "Goose Loonies", and led to an apology being issued by Demers. Campbell left the Red Wings after the dismissal of Demers in 1990.

Campbell then joined the New York Rangers as an associate coach for 1991–92, parts of 1992–93, and 1993–94. He was the head coach for the Rangers' top affiliate; the Binghamton Rangers of the American Hockey League for half of the 1992–93 season.

After head coach Mike Keenan left the Rangers after their Stanley Cup win in 1994, Campbell was promoted to take over for him. In the strike-shortened NHL season that followed, Campbell led the Rangers to a fourth-place finish in the Atlantic Division. That was good enough to get the Rangers into the playoffs as the eighth seed, where they faced the top-seeded Quebec Nordiques in the first round. The Rangers won the series in six games and handed the franchise its final series defeat in Quebec. The Rangers faced the Philadelphia Flyers in the second round and were promptly swept out of the playoffs.

Campbell led the Rangers back to the playoffs in 1995–96, as the team finished second behind the Flyers in the division. They then defeated the Montreal Canadiens in the opening series in six games after losing the first two but fell to the Pittsburgh Penguins in five games in the conference semifinals.

In 1996–97 Campbell's Rangers had their best and longest playoff run. Finishing fourth in their division but fifth in the conference, the Rangers knocked out the defending conference champion Florida Panthers in five games in the Eastern Conference Quarterfinals. They then upset their divisional rivals, the New Jersey Devils, in five games to advance to play the Flyers in the Eastern Conference Finals, where their run ended in five games.

After losing captain Mark Messier to free agency in the offseason and losing out on Joe Sakic in their quest to bring him to the team after the Colorado Avalanche matched the offer sheet the Rangers signed him to in 1997, Campbell's Rangers struggled out of the gate the next season and he was fired as coach after 57 games. The Rangers would not make the playoffs that season, nor would they again until the 2005-06 season under head coach Tom Renney. The team would also not win another playoff series, nor mere postseason game until they swept the Atlanta Thrashers during the 2007 Eastern Conference Quarterfinals.

Head coaching record

Executive career
Shortly after being fired by the Rangers, Campbell was hired by the NHL as the league's Senior Vice President and Director of Hockey Operations, taking over from the departed Brian Burke. During Campbell's tenure, the NHL has faced a number of high-profile incidents that required Campbell's attention, most notably the Marty McSorley/Donald Brashear stick-swinging incident, which resulted in a year-long suspension for McSorley, and the Todd Bertuzzi hit on Steve Moore.

During the 2004–05 NHL lockout, Campbell chaired a committee that looked into adjusting NHL rules, resulting in major changes for the 2005–06 NHL season.

On November 1, 2006, Campbell rejected a five-year, $7.5 million offer from the Philadelphia Flyers to be their general manager. There was speculation that he was holding out for the general manager job with the Toronto Maple Leafs (a position eventually filled by Brian Burke) after general manager John Ferguson Jr.'s contract was terminated in January 2008.

On November 15, 2010, TSN and various other media outlets reported on a string of emails from Colin Campbell. The email correspondence became a matter of public record in the wrongful dismissal case of referee Dean Warren against the NHL and the emails were entered into evidence in the case, although specific references to names and dates were blacked out. In these emails, Campbell calls Boston Bruins centre Marc Savard a "little fake artist" after Warren assessed Colin Campbell's son, Gregory Campbell, a high-sticking minor on Savard and sending further emails to director of officiating Stephen Walkom complaining about the work of referees who gave Gregory a late-game penalty that resulted in a tying goal. In a follow-up interview with TSN, Colin Campbell admitted "it (the email content) was inappropriate. But no one told me or maybe told you five years ago that you can take your emails and read them all." Despite the controversy and the admission of inappropriate content and accusations of bias, the NHL posted a strong backing of Campbell on their website and he continued in his role as the Senior Vice President until stepping down on June 1, 2011,
Brendan Shanahan replaced his position as Vice President of Player Safety. He stepped aside just prior to his son playing in the 2011 Stanley Cup final.

During voting for the 2016 NHL All-Star Game, career enforcer John Scott was leading fan voting as captain of the Pacific Division. In a piece for the Players' Tribune, John Scott revealed that one NHL executive attempted to shame him out of competing, asking how his children would feel about his participation. It was revealed many months later in a Twitter tirade from player Steve Downie that Colin Campbell was this executive.

He currently continues his role as Director of Hockey Operations.

See also
 List of family relations in the NHL

References

External links
 

1953 births
Living people
Canadian ice hockey coaches
Canadian ice hockey defencemen
Canadian people of Scottish descent
Colorado Rockies (NHL) players
Detroit Red Wings coaches
Detroit Red Wings players
Edmonton Oilers players
Ice hockey people from Ontario
New York Rangers coaches
Peterborough Petes (ice hockey) players
Pittsburgh Penguins draft picks
Pittsburgh Penguins players
Sportspeople from London, Ontario
Sportspeople from Tillsonburg
Stanley Cup champions
Vancouver Blazers draft picks
Vancouver Blazers players
Vancouver Canucks players
World Hockey Association first round draft picks